Quetiapine, sold under the brand name Seroquel among others, is an atypical antipsychotic medication used for the treatment of schizophrenia, bipolar disorder, and major depressive disorder. Despite being widely used as a sleep aid due to its sedating effect, the benefits of such use do not appear to generally outweigh the side effects. It is taken orally.

Common side effects include sleepiness, constipation, weight gain, and dry mouth. Other side effects include low blood pressure with standing, seizures, a prolonged erection, high blood sugar, tardive dyskinesia, and neuroleptic malignant syndrome. In older people with dementia, its use increases the risk of death. Use in the third trimester of pregnancy may result in a movement disorder in the baby for some time after birth. Quetiapine is believed to work by blocking a number of receptors including serotonin and dopamine.

Quetiapine was developed in 1985 and approved for medical use in the United States in 1997. It is available as a generic medication. In 2020, it was the 64th most commonly prescribed medication in the United States, with more than 10million prescriptions.

Medical uses

Quetiapine is primarily used to treat schizophrenia or bipolar disorder. Quetiapine targets both positive and secondary negative symptoms of schizophrenia.

Schizophrenia
A 2013 Cochrane review compared quetiapine to typical antipsychotics: 

In a 2013 comparison of 15 antipsychotics in effectiveness in treating schizophrenia, quetiapine demonstrated standard effectiveness. It was 13–16% more effective than ziprasidone, chlorpromazine, and asenapine and approximately as effective as haloperidol and aripiprazole.

There is tentative evidence of the benefit of quetiapine versus placebo in schizophrenia; however, definitive conclusions are not possible due to the high rate of attrition in trials (greater than 50%) and the lack of data on economic outcomes, social functioning, or quality of life.

It is debatable whether, as a class, typical or atypical antipsychotics are more effective. Both have equal drop-out and symptom relapse rates when typicals are used at low to moderate dosages. While quetiapine has lower rates of extrapyramidal side effects, there is greater sleepiness and rates of dry mouth.

A Cochrane review comparing quetiapine to other atypical antipsychotic agents tentatively concluded that it may be less efficacious than olanzapine and risperidone; produce fewer movement related side effects than paliperidone, aripiprazole, ziprasidone, risperidone and olanzapine; and produce weight gain similar to risperidone, clozapine and aripiprazole. They concluded that it produces suicide attempt, suicide; death; QTc prolongation, low blood pressure; tachycardia; sedation; gynaecomastia; galactorrhoea, menstrual irregularity and white blood cell count at a rate similar to first generation antipsychotics.

Bipolar disorder
In those with bipolar disorder, quetiapine is used to treat depressive episodes; acute manic episodes associated with bipolar I disorder (as either monotherapy or adjunct therapy to lithium; valproate or lamotrigine); acute mixed episodes; and maintenance treatment of bipolar I disorder (as adjunct therapy to lithium or divalproex).

Major depressive disorder
Quetiapine is effective when used by itself and when used along with other medications in major depressive disorder (MDD). However, sedation is often an undesirable side effect.

In the United States, the United Kingdom and Australia (while not subsidised by the Australian Pharmaceutical Benefits Scheme for treatment of MDD), quetiapine is licensed for use as an add-on treatment in MDD.

Alzheimer's disease
Quetiapine does not decrease agitation among people with Alzheimer's. Quetiapine worsens intellectual functioning in the elderly with dementia and therefore is not recommended.

Others
The use of low doses of quetiapine for insomnia, while common, is not recommended; there is little evidence of benefit and concerns regarding adverse effects. A 2022 network meta-analysis of 154 double-blind, randomized controlled trials of drug therapies vs. placebo for insomnia in adults found that quetiapine did not demonstrate any short-term benefits in sleep quality. Quetiapine, specifically, had an effect size (standardized mean difference) against placebo for treatment of insomnia of 0.05 (95%  –1.21 to 1.11) at 4weeks of treatment, with the certainty of evidence rated as very low. Doses of quetiapine used for insomnia have ranged from 12.5 to 800mg, with low doses of 25 to 200mg being the most typical. Regardless of the dose used, some of the more serious adverse effects may still possibly occur at the lower dosing ranges, such as dyslipidemia and neutropenia. These safety concerns at low doses are corroborated by Danish observational studies that showed use of specifically low-dose quetiapine (prescriptions filled for tablet strengths >50 mg were excluded) was associated with an increased risk of major cardiovascular events as compared to use of Z-drugs, with most of the risk being driven by cardiovascular death. Laboratory data from an unpublished analysis of the same cohort also support the lack of dose-dependency of metabolic side effects, as new use of low-dose quetiapine was associated with a risk of increased fasting triglycerides at 1-year follow-up.

It is sometimes used off-label, often as an augmentation agent, to treat conditions such as Tourette syndrome, musical hallucinations and anxiety disorders.

Quetiapine and clozapine are the most widely used medications for the treatment of Parkinson's disease psychosis due to their very low extrapyramidal side-effect liability. Owing to the risks associated with clozapine (e.g. agranulocytosis, diabetes mellitus, etc.), clinicians often attempt treatment with quetiapine first, although the evidence to support quetiapine's use for this indication is significantly weaker than that of clozapine.

Adverse effects
Sources for incidence lists:

Very common (>10% incidence) adverse effects
 Dry mouth
 Dizziness
 Headache
 Somnolence (drowsiness; of 15 antipsychotics quetiapine causes the 5th most sedation. Extended release (XR) formulations tend to produce less sedation, dose-by-dose, than the immediate release formulations.)

Common (1–10% incidence) adverse effects

 High blood pressure
 Orthostatic hypotension
 High pulse rate
 High blood cholesterol
 Elevated serum triglycerides
 Abdominal pain
 Constipation
 Increased appetite
 Vomiting
 Increased liver enzymes
 Backache
 Asthenia
 Insomnia
 Lethargy
 Tremor
 Agitation
 Nasal congestion
 Pharyngitis
 Fatigue
 Pain
 Dyspepsia (Indigestion)
 Peripheral oedema
 Dysphagia

 Extrapyramidal disease: Quetiapine and clozapine are noted for their relative lack of extrapyramidal side effects.
 Weight gain: SMD 0.43 kg when compared to placebo. Produces roughly as much weight gain as risperidone, less weight gain than clozapine, olanzapine and zotepine and more weight gain than ziprasidone, lurasidone, aripiprazole and asenapine. As with many other atypical antipsychotics, this action is likely due to its actions at the H1 histamine receptor and 5-HT2C receptor.

Rare (<1% incidence) adverse effects

 Prolonged QT interval (had an odds ratio for prolonging the QT interval over placebo of 0.17)
 Sudden cardiac death
 Syncope
 Diabetic ketoacidosis
 Restless legs syndrome
 Hyponatraemia, low blood sodium.
 Jaundice, yellowing of the eyes, skin and mucous membranes due to an impaired ability of the body to clear bilirubin, a by product of haem breakdown.
 Pancreatitis, pancreas swelling.
 Agranulocytosis, a potentially fatal drop in white blood cell count.
 Leukopenia, a drop in white blood cell count, not as severe as agranulocytosis.
 Neutropenia, a drop in neutrophils, the cell of the immune cells that defends the body against bacterial infections.
 Eosinophilia
 Anaphylaxis, a potentially fatal allergic reaction.
 Seizure
 Hypothyroidism, underactive thyroid gland.
 Myocarditis, swelling of the myocardium.
 Cardiomyopathy
 Hepatitis, swelling of the liver.
 Suicidal ideation
 Priapism. A prolonged and painful erection.
 Stevens–Johnson syndrome. A potentially fatal skin reaction.

 Neuroleptic malignant syndrome a rare and potentially fatal complication of antipsychotic drug treatment. It is characterised by the following symptoms: tremor, rigidity, hyperthermia, tachycardia, mental status changes (e.g. confusion), etc.
 Tardive dyskinesia. A rare and often irreversible neurological condition characterised by involuntary movements of the face, tongue, lips and rest of the body. Most commonly occurs after prolonged treatment with antipsychotics. It is believed to be particularly uncommon with atypical antipsychotics, especially quetiapine and clozapine

Both typical and atypical antipsychotics can cause tardive dyskinesia. According to one study, rates are lower with the atypicals at 3.9% as opposed to the typicals at 5.5%. Although quetiapine and clozapine are atypical antipsychotics, switching to these atypicals is an option to minimize symptoms of tardive dyskinesia caused by other atypicals.

Weight gain can be a problem for some, with quetiapine causing more weight gain than fluphenazine, haloperidol, loxapine, molindone, olanzapine, pimozide, risperidone, thioridazine, thiothixene, trifluoperazine, and ziprasidone, but less than chlorpromazine, clozapine, perphenazine, and sertindole.

As with some other anti-psychotics, quetiapine may lower the seizure threshold, and should be taken with caution in combination with drugs such as bupropion.

Discontinuation
The British National Formulary recommends a gradual withdrawal when discontinuing antipsychotics to avoid acute withdrawal syndrome or rapid relapse. Symptoms of withdrawal commonly include nausea, vomiting, and loss of appetite. Other symptoms may include restlessness, increased sweating, and trouble sleeping. Less commonly there may be a feeling of the world spinning, numbness, or muscle pains. Symptoms generally resolve after a short period of time.

There is tentative evidence that discontinuation of antipsychotics can result in psychosis. It may also result in reoccurrence of the condition that is being treated. Rarely tardive dyskinesia can occur when the medication is stopped.

Pregnancy and lactation
Placental exposure is least for quetiapine compared to other atypical antipsychotics. The evidence is insufficient to rule out any risk to the foetus but available data suggests it is unlikely to result in any major foetal malformations. It is secreted in breast milk and hence quetiapine-treated mothers are advised not to breastfeed.

Abuse potential
In contrast to most other antipsychotic drugs, which tend to be somewhat aversive and often show problems with patient compliance with prescribed medication regimes, quetiapine is sometimes associated with drug misuse and abuse potential, for its hypnotic and sedative effects. It has a limited potential for misuse, usually only in individuals with a history of polysubstance abuse and/or mental illness, and especially in those incarcerated in prisons or secure psychiatric facilities where access to alternative intoxicants is more limited. To a significantly greater extent than other atypical antipsychotic drugs, quetiapine was found to be associated with drug-seeking behaviors, and to have standardised street prices and slang terms associated with it, either by itself or in combination with other drugs (such as "Q-ball" for the intravenous injection of quetiapine mixed with cocaine). The pharmacological basis for this distinction from other second generation antipsychotic drugs is unclear, though it has been suggested that quetiapine's comparatively lower dopamine receptor affinity and strong antihistamine activity might mean it could be regarded as more similar to sedating antihistamines in this context. While these issues have not been regarded as sufficient cause for placing quetiapine under increased legal controls, prescribers have been urged to show caution when prescribing quetiapine to individuals with characteristics that might place them at increased risk for drug misuse.

Overdose
Most instances of acute overdosage result in only sedation, hypotension and tachycardia, but cardiac arrhythmia, coma and death have occurred in adults. Serum or plasma quetiapine concentrations are usually in the 1–10 mg/L range in overdose survivors, while postmortem blood levels of 10–25 mg/L are generally observed in fatal cases. Non-toxic levels in postmortem blood extend to around 0.8 mg/kg, but toxic levels in postmortem blood can begin at 0.35 mg/kg.

Pharmacology

Pharmacodynamics

Quetiapine has the following pharmacological actions:

 Dopamine D1, D2, D3, D4, and D5 receptor antagonist
 Serotonin 5-HT1A receptor partial agonist, 5-HT2A, 5-HT2B, 5-HT2C, 5-HT3, 5-HT6, and 5-HT7 receptor antagonist, and 5-HT1B, 5-HT1D, 5-HT1E, and 5-HT1F receptor ligand
 α1- and α2-adrenergic receptor antagonist
 Histamine H1 receptor antagonist
 Muscarinic acetylcholine receptor antagonist

This means quetiapine is a dopamine, serotonin, and adrenergic antagonist, and a potent antihistamine with some anticholinergic properties. Quetiapine binds strongly to serotonin receptors; the drug acts as partial agonist at 5-HT1A receptors. Serial PET scans evaluating the D2 receptor occupancy of quetiapine have demonstrated that quetiapine very rapidly disassociates from the D2 receptor. Theoretically, this allows for normal physiological surges of dopamine to elicit normal effects in areas such as the nigrostriatal and tuberoinfundibular pathways, thus minimizing the risk of side-effects such as pseudo-parkinsonism as well as elevations in prolactin. Some of the antagonized receptors (serotonin, norepinephrine) are actually autoreceptors whose blockade tends to increase the release of neurotransmitters.

At very low doses, quetiapine acts primarily as a histamine receptor blocker (antihistamine) and α1-adrenergic blocker. When the dose is increased, quetiapine activates the adrenergic system and binds strongly to serotonin receptors and autoreceptors. At high doses, quetiapine starts blocking significant amounts of dopamine receptors. Due to the drug's sedating H1 activity, it is often prescribed at low doses for insomnia. While some feel that low doses of drugs with antihistamine effects like quetiapine and mirtazapine are safer than drugs associated with physical dependency or other risk factors, concern has been raised by some professionals that off-label prescribing has become too widespread due to underappreciated hazards.

When treating schizophrenia, antagonism of D2 receptor by quetiapine in the mesolimbic pathway relieves positive symptoms and antagonism of the 5HT2A receptor in the frontal cortex of the brain may relieve negative symptoms and reduce severity of psychotic episodes. Quetiapine has fewer extrapyramidal side effects and is less likely to cause hyperprolactinemia when compared to other drugs used to treat schizophrenia, so is used as a first line treatment.

Amphetamine is well known for being an agonist at the TAAR1 receptor inside a dopaminergic neuron,so the TAAR1 receptor signals through two different proteinkinases whether the DAT transporter inhibits the monoamine reuptake or acts in reversal. There is little evidence that the TAAR1 receptor co-localizes and signalling also to the NET transporter. If so, than quetiapine can compete with this reuptake activity preventing release of norepinephrine through NET to some extent. With a NET occupancy of 35% with quetiapine XR 300 mg/day, most likely quetiapine isn't capable of inducing a competitive answer to amphetamine exposure, but maybe can have calming effects.

Pharmacokinetics
Peak levels of quetiapine occur 1.5 hours after a dose. The plasma protein binding of quetiapine is 83%. The major active metabolite of quetiapine is norquetiapine (N-desalkylquetiapine). Quetiapine has an elimination half-life of 6 or 7 hours. Its metabolite, norquetiapine, has a half-life of 9 to 12 hours. Quetiapine is excreted primarily via the kidneys (73%) and in feces (20%) after hepatic metabolism, the remainder (1%) is excreted as the drug in its unmetabolized form.

Chemistry
Quetiapine is a tetracyclic compound and is closely related structurally to clozapine, olanzapine, loxapine, and other tetracyclic antipsychotics.

Synthesis
The synthesis of quetiapine begins with a dibenzothiazepinone. The lactam is first treated with phosphoryl chloride to produce a dibenzothiazepine. A nucleophilic substitution is used to introduce the sidechain.

History

Sustained-release
AstraZeneca submitted a new drug application for a sustained-release version of quetiapine in the United States, Canada, and the European Union in the second half of 2006 for treatment of schizophrenia. AstraZeneca was to retain the exclusive right to market sustained-release quetiapine until 2017. The sustained-release quetiapine is marketed mainly as Seroquel XR. Other marketing names are Seroquel Prolong, Seroquel Depot and Seroquel XL

On 18 May 2007, AstraZeneca announced that the U.S. FDA approved Seroquel XR for acute treatment of schizophrenia. During its 2007 Q2 earnings conference, AstraZeneca announced plans to launch Seroquel XR in the U.S. during August 2007. However, Seroquel XR has become available in U.S. pharmacies only after the FDA approved Seroquel XR for use as maintenance treatment for schizophrenia, in addition to acute treatment of the illness, on 16 November 2007. The company has not provided a reason for the delay of Seroquel XR's launch.

Health Canada approved sale of Seroquel XR on 27 September 2007.

In early October 2008, the FDA approved Seroquel XR for the treatment of bipolar depression and bipolar mania. According to AstraZeneca, Seroquel XR is "the first medication approved by the FDA for the once-daily acute treatment of both depressive and manic episodes associated with bipolar."

On 31 July 2008, Handa Pharmaceuticals, based in Fremont, California, announced that its abbreviated new drug application ("ANDA") for quetiapine fumarate extended-release tablets, the generic version of AstraZeneca's SEROQUEL XR, has been accepted by the FDA.

On 1 December 2008, Biovail announced that the FDA had accepted the company's ANDA to market its own version of sustained-release quetiapine. Biovail's sustained-release tablets will compete with AstraZeneca's Seroquel XR.

On 24 December 2008, AstraZeneca notified shareholders that the FDA had asked for additional information on the company's application to expand the use of sustained-release quetiapine for treatment of depression.

Society and culture

Regulatory status
In the United States, the Food and Drug Administration (FDA) has approved quetiapine for the treatment of schizophrenia and of acute manic episodes associated with bipolar disorder (bipolar mania) and for treatment of bipolar depression. In 2009, quetiapine XR was approved as adjunctive treatment of major depressive disorder.

Quetiapine received its initial indication from U.S. FDA for treatment of schizophrenia in 1997. In 2004, it received its second indication for the treatment of mania-associated bipolar disorder. In 2007 and 2008, studies were conducted on quetiapine's efficacy in treating generalized anxiety disorder and major depression.

Patent protection for the product ended in 2012; however, in a number of regions, the long-acting version remained under patent until 2017.

Lawsuits
In April 2010, the U. S. Department of Justice fined Astra-Zeneca $520 million for the company's aggressive marketing of Seroquel for off-label uses. According to the Department of Justice, "the company recruited doctors to serve as authors of articles that were ghostwritten by medical literature companies and about studies the doctors in question did not conduct. AstraZeneca then used those studies and articles as the basis for promotional messages about unapproved uses of Seroquel."

Multiple lawsuits have been filed in relation to quetiapine's side-effects, in particular, diabetes.

Approximately 10,000 lawsuits have been filed against AstraZeneca, alleging that quetiapine caused problems ranging from slurred speech and chronic insomnia to deaths.

Controversy
In 2004, a young man named Dan Markingson committed suicide in a controversial Seroquel clinical trial at the University of Minnesota while under an involuntary commitment order. A group of University of Minnesota bioethicists charged that the trial involved an alarming number of ethical violations.

Nurofen Plus tampering case
In August 2011, the UK's Medicines and Healthcare products Regulatory Agency (MHRA) issued a class-4 drug alert following reports that some batches of Nurofen plus contained Seroquel XL tablets instead.

Following the issue of the Class-4 Drug Alert, Reckitt Benckiser (UK) Ltd received further reports of rogue blister strips in cartons of two additional batches of Nurofen Plus tablets. One of the new batches contained Seroquel XL 50 mg tablets and one contained the Pfizer product Neurontin 100 mg capsules.

Following discussions with the MHRA's Defective Medicines Report Centre (DMRC), Reckitt Benckiser (UK) Ltd decided to recall all remaining unexpired stock of Nurofen Plus tablets in any pack size, leading to a Class-1 Drug Alert. The contamination was later traced to in-store tampering by a customer.

References

External links 

 
 Australian Public Assessment Report for Quetiapine (as fumarate)

Alpha-1 blockers
Alpha-2 blockers
Antidepressants
Atypical antipsychotics
AstraZeneca brands
Dibenzothiazepines
Ethers
H1 receptor antagonists
Hypnotics
Mood stabilizers
Piperazines
Primary alcohols
Sedatives
Wikipedia medicine articles ready to translate